Phil Reavis (born October 10, 1936) is an American athlete. He competed in the men's high jump at the 1956 Summer Olympics.

References

1936 births
Living people
Athletes (track and field) at the 1956 Summer Olympics
American male high jumpers
Olympic track and field athletes of the United States
Place of birth missing (living people)